Herpothallon viridi-isidiatum is a species of crustose lichen in the family Arthoniaceae. Found in China, it was formally described as a new species in 2022 by Pengfei Chen and Lulu Zhang. The type was collected from the Baiyun Protection Station (Jingning County, Zhejiang) at an altitude of almost ; here, the lichen was found growing on the bark of Cunninghamia lanceolata. The species epithet viridi-isidiatum refers to the greenish-coloured pseudisidia. Gyrophoric acid, lecanoric acid, and umbilicaric acid are all lichen products that have been identified in this lichen.

References

Arthoniomycetes
Lichen species
Lichens described in 2022
Lichens of China